The 1981–82 season was the 85th season of Scottish league football.

Scottish Premier Division

Champions: Celtic
Relegated: Partick Thistle, Airdrieonians

Scottish League Division One

Promoted: Motherwell, Kilmarnock
Relegated: East Stirlingshire, Queen of the South

Scottish League Division Two

Promoted: Clyde, Alloa Athletic

Other honours

Cup honours

Individual honours

Scottish national team

Key:
(H) = Home match
(A) = Away match
WCQG6 = World Cup qualifying – Group 6
WCG6 = World Cup – Group 6
BHC = British Home Championship

See also
1981–82 Aberdeen F.C. season

Notes

References

 
Seasons in Scottish football